The head of Corpus Christi College, University of Oxford, is the president. The current president is Helen Moore who was appointed in 2018.

List of presidents of Corpus Christi College

References

 
Corpus Christi Presidents
Corpus Christi